This is a list of toys created by the popular children's television network Nickelodeon.

Compounds
A number of molding substances for children's play were created and sold by the American children's television channel Nickelodeon, through toy company partners in the 1990s. Like most molding compounds, they could be kept in their container to retain plasticity, or molded and allowed to harden overnight. They featured a wide variety of compounds with different attributes.

Nickelodeon/MTV Networks  (1986)

Green Slime Shampoo 
Green Slime Shampoo was among the very first consumer products released by Nickelodeon. It was a green-colored shampoo inspired by You Can't Do That on Television, produced and distributed by Nickelodeon/MTV Networks as a promotion for the channel. Advertised with the slogan "Gets you clean, won't turn you green!" kids could emulate being slimed like the performers on You Can't Do That on Television while taking showers or baths. The shampoo was sold through television commercials on Nickelodeon, in select retail stores, and was also featured as a prize during early seasons of Double Dare.

Green Slime Liquid Soap 
Released along with the shampoo, Green Slime Liquid Soap was green colored liquid hand soap, also produced directly by Nickelodeon/MTV Networks.

Mattel (1992–present)

Gak
Nickelodeon/Mattel's most popular compound; the product was inspired by the Nickelodeon show Double Dare. Similar to Wham-O's Super Stuff from the mid-1960s, the original edition was manufactured in 1992, and then re-issued in 1994 for the Nickelodeon Deluxe Gift Set which included one canister of Nickelodeon Gak and two canisters of Nickelodeon Floam. It was marketed on the fact that, unlike most of the compounds, it made a "fart" noise when squeezed into its clear, star-shaped container. Gak (among other varieties and accessories) returned to store shelves with modern-day Nickelodeon branding in 2012 and 2017; both 2010s incarnations were produced by NSI International. 

The name "gak" had previously been used by Marc Summers and the Double Dare crew to refer to slime used on the show. The name had originated as a street term for heroin. This was a source of amusement behind the scenes of Double Dare when Nickelodeon used the term for the toy Gak, unaware of its origin in drug culture.

Gak-in-the-Dark
Nickelodeon/Mattel's second kind of Gak that glowed in the dark after exposure to light. This variety was manufactured in 1994 and advertised in 1996 alongside the Make-Your-Own Gak Lab. The second and third incarnations were manufactured by NSI International in 2012 and 2017.

Solar Gak
Nickelodeon/Mattel's third kind of Gak that changed color when exposed to sunlight. This variety was manufactured in 1995. A second incarnation was slated to be resold by NSI International in 2013, with varying colors.

Smell My Gak
Nickelodeon/Mattel's fourth version of Gak that was scented. It was manufactured in 1996 with scents including Pickles, Flowers, Vanilla ice cream, Buttered Popcorn, Sunscreen, Hot Dog, Pepperoni Pizza, and Baby Powder. The cover of the original toy featured child actor Sean Martinez. This variety was resold by NSI International in 2013 with scents including Green Apple, Vanilla, Flowers, Bacon, Garbage, and Stinky Shoe.

Gak Activity Sets

Gak Pak
Three different color Gaks in one big container.

Gak Vac
A toy vacuum that sucks Gak up and spits it out. Four monster figures (called "Gakoids" in the 2012 re-release) are included. The toy was re-released with a new design by NSI International in 2012.

Gak's Alive
Gak's Alive was a dark black-colored Gak that was filled with magnetic particles or fine iron filings. The activity set also included a "magic wand" with a magnet on the end that could be used to entice the Gak to creep or move on its own.

Gak Inflator
A toy machine where Gak is placed underneath an O-ring and pumped until a bubble is made and popped; many users claimed that it dries out the compound quickly.

Gak Copier
A playset where the user draws on the foldable tablet, places some Gak on the other side, and closes the tablet. When opened, the drawing is transferred onto the Gak (similar to Silly Putty). This accessory was re-released in 2012 by NSI International.

Gakoids
This was a container for Gak that looked like a weird creature head whose eyes, nose and mouth would pop out when the Gak was squeezed in through the bottom of the head container. A newer version was made by NSI International in 2012, under the name "Gak Splat!"

Gak Color Mixer
A new playset released in 2012 by NSI International. It includes six colors of Gak (Blue, Red, Yellow, Green, Silver, and White) that can be mixed to create a new Gak color.

Gak Splat!

Gak Super-Stretch 
A 2013 Gak product by NSI International. It is basically a rebrand of the 2012 Gak colors with new packaging and a new formula which is identical to that of the original Gak. This line was presumably created due to customer complaints about their Gak not being squishy and stretchy like the television commercials show; instead being crumbly, sticky, slimy, and not stretchy.

Mood Gak
A 2013 Gak product by NSI International which is similar to 1995's Solar Gak. This variety changes color to the touch and returns to its normal color in sunlight.

Gak Twisted
A 2013 Gak product by NSI International. It is simply two Gak colors mixed together in a swirl-shaped container. This variety (and ones that preceded and followed) utilizes the super-stretch formula.

Galactic Gak
A 2014 Gak product by NSI International. It consists of three translucent, glittery Gak colors in outer space-themed containers (i.e. an atom; a shooting star).

Floam
In 1994, Nickelodeon and Mattel first manufactured Floam, originally called "bubble-gak", a compound composed of "microbeads" in a foam-like substance. It came in different colors.
RoseArt sold Floam for a very brief time in 2002. It was sold once again from 2005–2007 but without Nickelodeon branding. As of 2012, Floam is now sold again with Nickelodeon branding, as well as Gak and Slime.

Floam Sports and Floam In Flight
Floam Sports was a set where Floam is used to make sports equipment like balls, pins, and clubs. This was first sold in 1994.

Floam In Flight is a set where Floam is used to make Planes and other objects fly by loading a tube into the creation, then putting it on an air-tube launcher to make it fly. This was first sold in 1994.

Floam Shape Shop
The Floam Shape Shop was a contraption into which Floam was inserted and then pushed out in various shapes. It included different molds and front rings. This was first sold in 1995.

Floam Factory
The Floam Factory is a playset that makes creations using Floam shapes and patterns.

Floam Kit
The "Floam Flowers Kit" makes Floam flowers with packs of colors such as Red, Yellow and Blue.
"Floamies" are little bugs and animals that you can make with the "Floamies Kit".
The "Floamasaur Kit" includes a wooden dinosaur model and green Floam to make a dinosaur.

Glo Floam
Glo Floam is a variation of Floam made by NSI International in 2012. It varies from Colors such as Green, Blue, Orange, and Pink. It is a Toys R Us exclusive.

Floam Dome
The Floam Dome comes with 4 cookie cutters to make different designs. This is being sold as of 2012 by NSI International.

Zog Logs
Zog Logs were mini multi-colored logs that can be cut, bent, shaped, and attached to other structures to make various forms and shapes. This was first released in 1995.

Smud
Smud was a Nickelodeon/Mattel compound that was much like Play-Doh. It was marketed under the idea that unlike the previous compounds, it would not dry out if left out of its container. Each pack of Smud came with its own "Geronimold." It was from 1995-1997.

Sqand
Sqand, or "Magic sand", begins as ordinary sand, but is dyed and coated in a hydrophobic substance. This allows each particle to stay dry in water, so that underwater the sand appears not to have the same properties that any other sand has while wet: its cohesive force was greater than its adhesive force to water, so it preferred to stick together in surrealistically tall forms, rather than spread out as expected. When taken out of water Squand immediately returned to normal looking, dry sand. Mattel sold it off quickly. Originally marketed in 1991, it was later sold off, being re-branded without Nickelodeon trademarks today; first by RoseArt in 1995, and again being renamed "Aqua Sand", mainly directed at girls.

Zzand
Zzand is a modeling compound very similar to Play-Doh, however, its defining feature is the sand distributed throughout it. Marketed with the slogan "Looks like Sand, Molds like Dough!", its default color is green and is notorious for being extremely messy.

Jakks Pacific/Flying Colors (1999–2004)

Goooze
A Nickelodeon/Flying Colors/Jakks Pacific compound similar to Gak but almost transparent. It was made to promote Double Dare 2000. Besides the regular Goooze, there were other variations of it such as Glow-In-The-Dark Goooze, Scented Goooze, and Glitter Goooze. In later years, Goooze was sold as "Goooze Toons" which had a Nicktoons character (such as SpongeBob SquarePants, Patrick Star, Cosmo and Wanda) with Goooze included to put in the character and watch it ooze out when opened. This, along with Gak Splat Balls (Below) were the most popular compounds that Jakks Pacific and Flying Colors made.

In 2014, this compound was revived by Spin Master without any Nickelodeon branding under the "Goozerk" name as part of its "Wacky-tivities" brand line.

Gak Splat Balls
A Nickelodeon/Flying Colors compound that is not like Gak in its properties, but shares a similar name. It resembles a cross between Gak and Goooze and unlike other compounds, it was not moldable, having a ball shape. Often it was packaged with a mitt of the same substance for playing catch. This, along with Goooze, were one of the most popular toys that Jakks Pacific/Flying Colors made.

Also it was the first compound to be released under the "Nick-tivities" banner. All compounds following were released under the same banner.

Slime 
A green Nickelodeon slime compound was sold in Fall 2008, released by Jakks Pacific. It was released again in March 2012 along with Gak and Floam. In 2017, they were all rereleased with logo changes.

Smatter
A Nickelodeon/Flying colors compound that is Nickelodeon's alternative to "Silly String". It came in different colors, and different varieties such as Smatter Blaster, Spit Smatter, and Fatter Smatter.  However, it was voluntarily recalled in 2003 due to incidents where the aerosol cans forcefully broke apart, resulting in a laceration injury to a consumer and several incidents involving property damage.

In 2014, Spin Master revived this product without Nickelodeon branding as "Spatter" under their "Wacky-tivities" banner. The only significant difference from Smatter is that the compound does not grow.

Skweeez
A modeling compound that was like Play-Doh packaged in a squeezable pouch. It was sold in sets with Nickelodeon and Nick Jr. characters.

Splish Splat!
A Nickelodeon and Flying Colors/Jakks Pacific compound that was released in 2004. Splish Splat was similar to Nickelodeon Gak and Goooze. Splish Splat! was used on the contestants during the show Nickelodeon Splat!.

Zyrofoam
A Nickelodeon modeling compound that was like a cross between Floam, a previous Nickelodeon compound, and Play-Doh. It was originally released in 2001, but Flying Colors stopped selling the product a year later for unknown reasons.

Other toys

Mattel/Long Hall Technologies (1992–1999)

Color Writer
Released in 1992, the Color Writer looked like an Etch-a-sketch, but it drew in color. The Super Color Writer was released a year later.

Flash Screen
The Flash Screen was meant to be played in a dark room and included a white glow-in-the dark poster with a two-in-one "Zapper" which featured a camera flash top with flashlight bottom. The user would turn on the camera flash and leave a shadow silhouette of themselves on the white poster emitting a green glow. The user can then take the flashlight pen and draw on their silhouette. The toy was eventually canceled due to claims of health hazards with children experiencing seizures due to staring at the flashbulb too much.

TimeBlaster Alarm Clock
An alarm clock/radio featuring a light function. The light is a green zig-zag shaped tube running across the top of the clock. A variety of sounds were available for selection.

Nickelodeon PhotoBlaster

Nickelodeon-themed electronics
There were also other electronics with Nickelodeon themes, including the Talkblaster (phone), Blastbox (boombox with cassette player), CD Blast Box (boombox with a CD player), Blast Pads (headphones), 2 Blast Packs (portable cassette or AM/FM radio), a computer keyboard, and a Gakulator (calculator).

Video Games
From 1996 until 2000, Mattel Media made various video games based on Nickelodeon properties.

Nickelodeon DVD Bingo
Nickelodeon DVD Bingo is a DVD board game version of usual Bingo released in 2006. The DVD is narrated by SpongeBob, the titular character of SpongeBob SquarePants.

Scholastic

ToonTwister 3D
A game where you can create your own Nicktoons episodes based on SpongeBob SquarePants, Rugrats, The Fairly OddParents, and Jimmy Neutron by choosing scenes, characters, and props.

References

toys
1980s toys
1990s toys
2000s toys
2010s toys